Charles Ragland Bunnell (1897–1968), was an American painter, printmaker, and muralist.

Bunnell was born in Kansas City, Missouri in 1897.  He moved to Colorado Springs in 1915. Bunnell enlisted and served in the United States Army during World War I. He studied at the Broadmoor Art Academy, (now the Colorado Springs Fine Arts Center). 

In 1934 Bunnell won a commission from the Public Works of Art Project (PWAP) to complete a mural for West Junior High School in Colorado Springs. He worked with Frank Mechau on the mural for the Colorado Springs Post Office and went on to create paintings for the Federal Art Project of the Works Progress Administration.

Bunnell moved away from American Scene painting and into abstract art. Marika Herskovic's American Abstract Expressionism of the 1950s : an Illustrated Survey (New York School Press, 2003), provides an accounting of this period in Bunnell's stylistic evolution. 

In 1964 Bunnell was interviewed for the Archives of American Art's New Deal and the Arts project. His work is in the collections of the Nelson-Atkins Museum of Art, the Taylor Museum in the Colorado Springs Fine Arts Center, and Denver's Kirkland Museum,  He died in Colorado Springs in 1968.

See also
Federal Art Project
Bodley Gallery

References

Further reading
 Charles Bunnell;  Amarillo Art Center.;  Dord Fitz Gallery. Charles Bunnell (1897-1968) : the past remembered : a retrospective exhibition, September 12-October 18, 1987 (Amarillo, Texas : Amarillo Art Center, 1987) ,  [includes color images of Bunnell's work]
 Doris Ostrander Dawdy. Artists of the American West : a biographical dictionary (Chicago : Sage Books, [1974]-1985) ,  [includes color images of Bunnell's work]
 Marika Herskovic. American abstract expressionism of the 1950s : an illustrated survey : with artists' statements, artwork and biographies (New York : New York School Press, 2003) [includes color images of Bunnell's work]
 Stanley Cuba.  John F. Carlson and Artists of the Broadmoor Academy , David Cook Fine Art, Denver, Colorado, 1999.    
 Cori Sherman North.  Charles Bunnell: Rocky Mountain Modern , Colorado Springs Fine Arts Center, Colorado Springs, Colorado, 2013.   

1897 births
1968 deaths
Artists from Kansas City, Missouri
20th-century American painters
American male painters
Modern painters
Abstract expressionist artists
Modern printmakers
American muralists
Landscape artists
Painters from Missouri
Artists from Colorado Springs, Colorado
Federal Art Project artists
20th-century American printmakers
20th-century American male artists